Events from the year 1500 in the Kingdom of Scotland.

Incumbents
Monarch – James IV

Births
 23 April – Alexander Ales, theologian (died 1565)
 Approximate date – Robert Dunbar of Durris

Deaths
 Robert Lundie, knight, Master of the Royal Artillery, and Lord High Treasurer of Scotland
 Approximate date – Hugh Fraser, 1st Lord Lovat

See also

 Timeline of Scottish history

References

 
Years of the 15th century in Scotland